Pyramid Peak is a 12,779-foot-elevation (3,895 meter) mountain summit located west of the crest of the Sierra Nevada mountain range, in Fresno County, California, United States. Other nearby peaks include Crater Mountain  to the northeast, and Window Peak one mile to the south.

Etymology
This mountain was likely named by Joseph Nisbet LeConte when he and four companions climbed nearby Arrow Peak in June 1902 and noted an "unnamed, unknown peak", which he would later list as "Pyramid". The toponym was labeled on the 1907 Mt. Whitney Quadrangle topographic map, and has been officially adopted by the United States Board on Geographic Names.

Climbing
One possible approach option to this remote peak is the John Muir Trail which passes to the east of the mountain. The first ascent of the summit was made July 21, 1942, by Art Reyman via a traverse from Window Peak to the south ridge. Inclusion on the Sierra Peaks Section peakbagging list generates climbing interest.

Climate
According to the Köppen climate classification system, Pyramid Peak is located in an alpine climate zone. Most weather fronts originate in the Pacific Ocean, and travel east toward the Sierra Nevada mountains. As fronts approach, they are forced upward by the peaks (orographic lift), causing them to drop their moisture in the form of rain or snowfall onto the range. Precipitation runoff from the mountain drains into tributaries of the South Fork Kings River.

See also
 
 List of mountain peaks of California

Gallery

References

Mountains of Fresno County, California
Mountains of Kings Canyon National Park
North American 3000 m summits
Mountains of Northern California
Sierra Nevada (United States)